Senator Hanna may refer to:

Mark Hanna (1837–1904), U.S. Senator from Ohio
Robert Hanna (1786–1858), U.S. Senator from Indiana